Robert Bruce Barr (born October 1953) is an American businessman who co-founded the boutique investment bank Lincoln International in 1996. He has also served as the firm's Co-CEO since its inception.

Education
Barr received a Bachelor of Arts in mathematics, statistics and economics from Case Western Reserve University and a Master of Business Administration from Harvard Business School.

Career
Prior to his time at Lincoln International, he held senior positions at both Peers & Company and Paine Webber, overseeing more than 100 merger & acquisition transactions across a variety of industries.

During his tenure as chief executive, Lincoln International has consistently experienced double-digit growth in both deal flow and revenue, becoming a key player in middle market investment banking. Currently, the firm logs approximately 400 deals annually. He was the recipient of ACQ magazine's annual award for leadership in the global investment banking industry in 2013.

References

1953 births
Living people
American chief executives of financial services companies
Case Western Reserve University alumni
Investment bankers
20th-century American businesspeople
Harvard Business School alumni